Michetti is an Italian surname. Notable people with the surname include:

 Emanuele Michetti Italian director and screenwriter
 Francesco Paolo Michetti (1851–1929) Italian painter
 Gabriela Michetti, Argentine politician
 Giorgio Michetti, Italian World War I flying ace
 Nicola Michetti (1675–1758) Italian architect active in Russia

Italian-language surnames
Patronymic surnames